The 15th Annual Helpmann Awards for live performance in Australia were held on 27 July 2015 at the Capitol Theatre in Sydney. Best Musical and Best Play were both awarded to revival productions, of Les Misérables and The Glass Menagarie respectively. Opera for young audiences The Rabbits was named Best New Australian Work and Best Original Score. Singer-songwriter Paul Kelly received the JC Williamson Award for lifetime achievement.

Winners and nominees
In the following tables, winners are listed first and highlighted in boldface. The nominees are those which are listed below the winner and not in boldface.

Theatre

Musicals

Opera and Classical Music

Dance and Physical Theatre

Contemporary Music

Other

Industry

Special Awards

Notes
A: The full producing credit for Dirty Dancing - The Classic Love Story on Stage is John Frost, Karl Sydow, Martin McCullum and Joyce Entertainment in association with Lionsgate & Magic Hour.
B: The full producing credit for Once is John Frost, Barbara Broccoli, John N. Hart Jr, Patrick Milling Smith and Frederick Zollo in association with the Melbourne Theatre Company.

References

External links
The official Helpmann Awards website

Helpmann Awards
Helpmann Awards
Helpmann Awards
Helpmann Awards
Helpmann Awards, 15th
Helpmann Awards